Migalovci is a  settlement in the municipality of Čaglin, Pozega-Slavonia County, Croatia. It has 129 inhabitants (2011).

References

Populated places in Požega-Slavonia County